Namak is a 1996 Hindi-language action film directed and produced by Kawal Sharma. The film stars Sanjay Dutt and Farah Naaz. The music of the film was composed by Anu Malik. The film was a remake of the 1975 super-hit Pakistani film Pehchan starring Shabnam and Nadeem.

Cast
 Shammi Kapoor as Lala Kedarnath Sharma 
 Sanjay Dutt as Gopal
 Farah as Dr. Anju
 Nirupa Roy as Shanti Sharma
 Prem Chopra as Rajinder "Jinder"
 Raza Murad as Rajeshwarnath
 Shakti Kapoor as Jagdish
 Gulshan Grover as Balwinder "Ballu" / "Gullu"
 Dinesh Hingoo as Munimji
 Jagdeep as Police Inspector
 Siddhant Salaria as Prabhat Sharma
 Sahila Chadha as Asha Sharma
 Amita Nangia as Sunita

Soundtrack
The Music of the film was composed by Anu Malik and Released by Venus World Wide Entertainment.

References

External links
 

1990s Hindi-language films
1996 films
Indian remakes of Pakistani films
Indian drama films
Films scored by Anu Malik
Films directed by Kawal Sharma
1996 drama films
Hindi-language drama films